is a railway station on the Tokyu Ikegami Line in Ōta, Tokyo, Japan, operated by the private railway operator Tokyu Corporation.

Lines

Station layout
The station has two ground-level (partly elevated) side platforms serving two tracks.

Platforms

History 
It was renamed Otakesan on 1 June 1933.

Passenger statistics
In fiscal 2011, the station was used by an average of 23,588 passengers daily.

Surrounding area
 Den Enchofu High School

See also
 List of railway stations in Japan

References

External links 

  

Tokyu Ikegami Line
Stations of Tokyu Corporation
Railway stations in Japan opened in 1923
Railway stations in Tokyo